Statistics of the Scottish Football League in season 1910–11.

Scottish League Division One

Scottish League Division Two

See also
1910–11 in Scottish football

References

 
1910-11